Preguiça is a settlement in the central part of the island of São Nicolau, Cape Verde. It is situated on the south coast, 6 km south of Ribeira Brava. It served as the port of Ribeira Brava, after the older Porto de Lapa, 6 km to the northeast, had been abandoned in 1653 due to pirate attacks. 
The settlement was mentioned as Paraghisi in the 1747 map by Jacques-Nicolas Bellin. In 1820 the Forte do Príncipe Real, now ruined, was built to protect the port. Preguiça's port consists of a stone quay and a short mole. Preguiça Airport is located 3 km north of the village.

Population history
2000: 465
2010: 567

See also
		
List of villages and settlements in Cape Verde

References

Villages and settlements in São Nicolau, Cape Verde
Populated coastal places in Cape Verde
Ribeira Brava, Cape Verde
Ports and harbours of Cape Verde